USS Ponce (SP-364) was an 18-ton motorboat in the service of the United States Navy during World War I. She was returned or sold from service on December 19, 1917.

References

External links
 NavSource Online: Section Patrol Craft (SP) and Civilian Vessels (ID) Index

Patrol vessels of the United States Navy
World War I patrol vessels of the United States